The 2020 AFC Futsal Championship would have been the 16th edition of the AFC Futsal Championship, the biennial international futsal championship organised by the Asian Football Confederation (AFC) for the men's national teams of Asia. A total of 16 teams would have taken part in the tournament.

The tournament was originally scheduled to be played in Turkmenistan between 26 February and 8 March 2020. However, the AFC announced on 3 February 2020 that due to the COVID-19 pandemic, the tournament had been postponed following consultation with all relevant stakeholders. On 9 March 2020, FIFA and AFC announced that the tournament were postponed to 5–16 August 2020, but in July 2020, the tournament schedule was moved again to 4–15 November 2020. On 10 September 2020, the AFC announced that the tournament would instead be held in Kuwait between 2–13 December 2020. On 15 October 2020, the AFC announced that due to spike of COVID-19 cases in Kuwait, the tournament was further postponed to 2021. On 10 November 2020, the AFC approved the new dates as between 23 March and 3 April 2021. However, AFC announced the cancellation of the tournament on 25 January 2021, leaving the hosting rights for the 2022 AFC Futsal Asian Cup with Kuwait.

Same as previous editions held on the same year as the FIFA Futsal World Cup, the tournament would have acted as the AFC qualifiers for the World Cup. The top five teams of the tournament would have qualified for the 2021 FIFA Futsal World Cup (originally 2020 but postponed due to COVID-19 pandemic) in Lithuania as the AFC representatives. On 21 April 2021, the AFC announced that Iran, Japan, and Uzbekistan were nominated as the AFC representatives, while the remaining two teams to be determined by play-off matches between Iraq (although Iraq had not qualified for the 2020 AFC Futsal Championship), Lebanon, Thailand, and Vietnam.

Iran were the defending champions.

Host selection
The following nations expressed interest to host the tournament:
  (Kuwait City)
 (Amman)
 (Nagoya)
 (Ashgabat)
 (Jakarta)

In spring 2019, Turkmenistan was chosen as the host to take place in Ashgabat, before being moved to Kuwait.

Qualification

Qualifying was played from 16 – 27 October 2019. Turkmenistan also participated in the qualifiers, even though they had already qualified automatically as hosts. Kuwait had to play the qualifying round (in case of a non-qualification, another host would have been chosen).

Qualified teams
The following 16 teams qualified for the final tournament.

Venues
The competition was originally to be played at the Main Indoor Arena and the Martial Arts Arena in Ashgabat, before being moved to Kuwait.

Original host

New host

Squads

Each team had to submit a squad of 14 players, including a minimum of two goalkeepers.

Draw
The final draw was held on 6 December 2019, 15:00 TMT (UTC+5), at the Olympia Hotel in Ashgabat. The 16 teams were drawn into four groups of four teams. The teams were seeded according to their performance in the 2018 AFC Futsal Championship final tournament and qualification, with the original hosts Turkmenistan automatically seeded and assigned to Position A1 in the draw.

Group stage
The top two teams of each group would have advanced to the quarter-finals.

Tiebreakers
The teams were ranked according to points (3 points for a win, 1 point for a draw, 0 points for a loss). If tied on points, tiebreakers would be applied in the following order:
Greater number of points obtained in the group matches between the teams concerned;
Goal difference resulting from the group matches between the teams concerned;
Greater number of goals scored in the group matches between the teams concerned;
If, after applying criteria 1 to 3, teams still have an equal ranking, criteria 1 to 3 are reapplied exclusively to the matches between the teams in question to determine their final rankings. If this procedure does not lead to a decision, criteria 5 to 9 apply;
Goal difference in all the group matches;
Greater number of goals scored in all the group matches;
Penalty shoot-out if only two teams are involved and they are both on the field of play;
Fewer score calculated according to the number of yellow and red cards received in the group matches (1 point for a single yellow card, 3 points for a red card as a consequence of two yellow cards, 3 points for a direct red card, 4 points for a yellow card followed by a direct red card);
Drawing of lots.

All times are local, AST (UTC+3).

Group A

Group B

Group C

Group D

Knockout stage
In the knockout stage, extra time and penalty shoot-out would be used to decide the winner if necessary (no extra time would be used in the third place match).

Bracket

Quarter-finals
Winners would have qualified for 2021 FIFA Futsal World Cup. Losers would have entered fifth place play-offs.

Fifth place play-offs

Semi-finals

Fifth place match
Winner would have qualified for 2021 FIFA Futsal World Cup.

Third place match

Final

See also
2021 FIFA Futsal World Cup qualification (AFC)

References

External links
, the-AFC.com
AFC Futsal Championship 2020, stats.the-AFC.com

 
2020
Championship
Afc
2020 AFC Futsal Championship
Association football events cancelled due to the COVID-19 pandemic